Daban may refer to:

Places
Daban, China, a village in Fujian, China
Daban, Kati Cercle, a village and rural commune in the Kati Cercle in the Koulikoro Region, Mali
Daban, Russia, a selo in Olyokminsky District of the Sakha Republic, Russia

People
Jacques Tisné Daban, mayor of Aast, a commune in the Aquitane region of France, in 1871–1881

See also